Mat Stevenson (born 15 April 1969) credited  variously as Matthew Stevenson and Matt Stevenson, is an Australian actor, known for his TV roles in soap opera's and miniseries. He is best known for his role as Adam Cameron in TV soap opera Home and Away

Biography 
Stevenson made his debut in the TV film Breaking Up, prior two landing the role  in Home and Away from 1989 to 1994, making a return appearance in 1999. Prior to Home and Away, Stevenson played the part of "Skinner", a treacherous petty criminal whom Todd Landers had befriended on Network Ten's Neighbours.

Before his fame in Home and Away, Stevenson worked as a swimming pool cleaner. His other television roles have included Blue Heelers, MDA, City Homicide and Offspring.

In 2010, Stevenson appeared in three episodes of Network Ten's Rush'' as Inspector Cox.

He is the father of internet celebrity and transgender rights activist Grace Hyland.

Filmography

References

External links
 

1969 births
20th-century Australian male actors
21st-century Australian male actors
Australian male film actors
Australian male television actors
Living people
Male actors from Melbourne
People from Melbourne